William B. "Bill" Rudman (born 1944) is a malacologist from New Zealand and Australia. In particular he studies sea slugs, opisthobranch gastropod molluscs, and has named many species of nudibranchs.

Rudman ran the Sea Slug Forum, a website affiliated with the Australian Museum. In Rudman's words, the forum "aims to generate more interest in these fascinating animals by sharing information with a worldwide audience.". Sea Slug Forum has information and numerous images of nudibranchs, bubble-snails, sea hares and other kinds of sea slugs. It was discontinued in 2010 after 14,523 messages had been posted. It is still online as a resource, but not accepting new messages.

Taxa
Species named in honour of this malacologist include:
 Aplysia rudmani Bebbington, 1974
 Cadulus rudmani Lamprell & Healy, 1998
 Hypselodoris rudmani Gosliner & R. F. Johnson, 1999
 Phyllidiella rudmani Brunckhorst, 1993
 Phyllodesmium rudmani Burghardt & Gosliner, 2006
 Trapania rudmani M. C. Miller, 1981

The World Register of Marine Species (WoRMS) lists 186 marine species named by Rudman.

Bibliography 
Rudman's bibliography includes:
	Rudman, W. B. 1968 "Three new species of the opisthobranch family Aglajidae from New Zealand." Transactions of the Royal Society of New Zealand, Zoology 10(23): 211-216.

See also
:Category:Taxa named by William B. Rudman

References

Further reading
 Loch I. (1988). W. B. Rudman – Malacological bibliography and described Taxa. Sydney: Australian Museum, 8 pp.
 Miller A. (1998). "Shellebrities, W. B. Rudman, BSc. MSc. (Hons) PhD. DSc". Australian Shell News 101: 7. (with portrait).

External links 

New Zealand malacologists
1944 births
Living people